Joachim Menant (16 April 1820 – 30 August 1899) was a French magistrate and orientalist.

He was born in Cherbourg. He studied law and became vice-president of the tribunal civil of Rouen in 1878, and a member of the court of appeal three years later. But he became best known for his studies on cuneiform inscriptions.

He also collaborated with Julius Oppert. He was admitted to the Academy of Inscriptions in 1887, and died in Paris two years later.

His daughter Delphine (b. 1850) received a prize from the Académie française for her Les Parsis, histoire des communautés zoroastriennes de l'Inde (1898), and was sent in 1900–1901 to British India on a scientific mission, of which she published a report in 1903.

Selected bibliography 
 La Bibliothèque du palais de Ninive, Paris, E. Leroux, 1880. Texte en ligne
 Les Langues perdues de la Perse et de l'Assyrie, Paris, E. Leroux, 1886. Texte en ligne
 Annales des rois d'Assyrie, traduites et mises en ordre sur le texte assyrien, Paris, Maisonneuve, 1874
 Babylone et la Chaldée, Paris, Maisonneuve, 1875
 Catalogue des cylindres orientaux du Cabinet royal des médailles de La Haye, La Haye : Imprimerie de l'État, 1878
 Collection épigraphique de M. Lottin de Laval. Inscriptions en caractères cunéiformes des briques de Babylone. Essai de lecture et d'interprétation, Caen, Impr. Hardel, 1859
 Découvertes assyriennes; la bibliothèque du palais de Ninive. Paris, E. Leroux, 1880
 Éléments d'épigraphie assyrienne ; les écritures cunéiformes, exposé des travaux qui ont préparé la lecture et l'interprétation des inscriptions de la Perse et de l'Assyrie, Paris, B. Duprat, 1864
 Éléments d'épigraphie assyrienne ; manuel de la langue assyrienne: I. Le syllabaire. II. La grammaire. III. Choix de lectures, Paris, Imprimerie nationale, 1880
 Éléments d'épigraphie assyrienne. Le syllabaire assyrien, exposé des éléments du système phonétique de l'écriture anarienne, Paris, Imprimerie impériale, 1869-1873
 Éléments du syllabaire hétéen, Paris, Imprimerie nationale : C. Klincksieck, 1892
 Empreintes de cylindres assyro-chaldéens relevées sur les contrats d'intérêt privé du Musée Britannique, Paris, Imprimerie nationale, 1880
 Exposé des éléments de la grammaire assyrienne, Paris, Imprimerie impériale, 1868
 Grande inscription du palais de Khorsabad. Paris, Imprimerie Impériale, 1863
 Inscriptions assyriennes des briques de Babylone ; essai de lecture et d'interprétation, Paris, B. Duprat, 1859
 Inscriptions de Hammourabi, roi de Babylone (XVIe siècle avant J.-C.), Paris, B. Duprat, 1863
 Inscriptions des revers de plaques du palais de Khorsabad, Paris, Imprimerie impériale, 1865
 Kar-Kemish : sa position d'après les découvertes modernes, Paris, Imprimerie nationale, 1891
 La Bible et les cylindres chaldéens, Paris, Imprimerie nationale, 1880, 1879
 La Stèle de Chalouf ; essai de restitution du texte perse, Paris, F. Vieweg, 1887
 Leçons d'épigraphie assyrienne professées aux cours libres de la Sorbonne pendant l'année 1869, Paris, Maisonneuve, 1873
 Les Achéménides et les inscriptions de la Perse, Paris, A. Lévy, 1872
 Les Cylindres orientaux du Cabinet royal des médailles à La Haye, Paris, Imprimerie nationale, 1879
 Les Écritures cunéiformes exposé des travaux qui on préparé la lecture et l'interprétation des inscriptions de la Perse et de l'Assyrie, Paris, Duprat, 1860 
 Les Fausses Antiquités de l'Assyrie et de la Chaldée, Paris, Ernest Leroux, 1888
 Les Langues perdues de la Perse & de l'Assyrie, Paris, Ernest Leroux, 1885-1886
 Les Noms propres assyriens. recherches sur la formation des expressions idéographiques. Paris, Benjamin Duprat, 1861
 Les Pierres gravées de la Haute-Asie. Recherches sur la glyptique orientale, Paris, Maisonneuve, 1886
 Les Yédidiz ; épisodes de l'histoire des adorateurs du diable, Paris, E. Leroux, 1892
 Manuel de la langue assyrienne. Paris, Imprimerie nationale, 1880
 Ninive et Babylone, Paris, Hachette, coll. , 1888
 Notice sur les inscriptions en caractères cunéiformes de la collection épigraphique de M. Lottin de Laval, Caen, A. Hardel, 1858
 Notice sur quelques empreintes de cylindres du dernier empire de Chaldée, Paris, Imprimerie nationale, 1879
 Observations sur les polyphones assyriens, Lisieux, A. Durand, 1859
 Observations sur trois cylindres orientaux, Paris, Maisonneuve, 1880
 Rapport sur les inscriptions assyriennes du British Museum, Paris, 1862-1863
 Remarques sur les portraits des rois assyrochaldéens, Paris, Imprimerie nationale, 1882
 Zoroaster ; essai sur la philosophie religieuse de la Perse, Paris, Derache, 1857

References

External links 
 

1820 births
1899 deaths
People from Cherbourg-Octeville
Linguists from France
Writers from Normandy
French philologists
French Assyriologists
Members of the Académie des Inscriptions et Belles-Lettres
Chevaliers of the Légion d'honneur
Zoroastrian studies scholars
19th-century translators
Assyriologists